The 1972 Men of the Midlands was a professional invitational snooker tournament, that took place from 3 January to 20 March 1972. The tournament was won by Alex Higgins, who defeated John Spencer 4–2 in the final.

The competition featured a round-robin group stage, with four players progressing into the semi-finals. Higgins won 4–0 against Ray Reardon in one semi final, and Spencer defeated Graham Miles 4–0 in the other.

Higgins won the first frame of the final, after Spencer missed an easy , and Spencer won the second frame. In the third, Higgins made  of 37 and 28 to win. The fourth frame saw both players miss changes to win, with Higgins eventually taking it with a break of 48. Spencer compiled a 58 break in winning the fifth frame, before Higgins won the sixth, with breaks of 24, 20 and 27, to win the match 4–2.

The tournament was sponsored by Mitchells and Butlers, who provided a prize fund of £1,000. Higgins received £300 as winner, and Spencer took £225 as runner-up.

Knockout results

References

Men of the Midlands
Men of the Midlands